Thomas St Aubyn (c. 1578 – 1637) was an English politician.

He was the son of Thomas St Aubyn of Clowance in Cornwall and studied at Queen's College, Oxford and the Middle Temple.

He was elected the MP for St Ives in the Parliament of 1601 alongside Thomas Barton and MP for Grampound in the Addled Parliament (1614).

He married Katherine, the daughter of John Bonython of Carclew with whom he had two sons and a daughter.

References

Year of birth unknown
1570s births
1637 deaths
People from St Ives, Cornwall
Members of the pre-1707 English Parliament for constituencies in Cornwall
Place of birth unknown
English MPs 1601
English MPs 1614
Alumni of The Queen's College, Oxford